Jennifer Monserrate is an Indian Politician from the state of Goa. She is a third term member from Taleigao Constituency of the Goa Legislative Assembly. She is the incumbent Cabinet Minister for Revenue, IT, Labour and Employment under the Chief Minister of Dr. Pramod Sawant. She assumed office of Minister of Revenue and IT in July 2019. 

She succeeds Mr. Rohan Khaunte who was earlier the Minister of Revenue & IT. She is the only woman Minister in Dr. Pramod Sawant's Cabinet as well as the first woman MLA to be elected from Taleigao Assembly for two successive terms.

She was one of the ten members of Indian National Congress who joined Bharatiya Janata Party in July 2019.

Personal life
She is married to Politician and three term Member of the Goa Legislative Assembly Atanasio Monserrate also known as Babush Monserrate. Since 2012, Atanasio and Jennifer are recognized as the first spousal couple in the Goa Legislative Assembly.  Since 2022, Goa Legislative Assembly other spousal couples include Michael Lobo and Delilah Lobo, respectively from Calangute and Siolim Constituencies as well as Vishwajit Pratapsingh Rane and Deviya Vishwajit Rane, respectively from Valpoi and Porem constituencies.

Committees
Public Accounts Committee member since 8 Aug. 2012.
Committee On Petitions member	since 8 Aug. 2012.

References

External links
Members of the Goa Legislative Assembly 

1970 births
Living people
Women in Goa politics
People from North Goa district
21st-century Indian women politicians
21st-century Indian politicians
Goa MLAs 2017–2022
Former members of Indian National Congress from Goa
Women members of the Goa Legislative Assembly
Bharatiya Janata Party politicians from Goa
Goa MLAs 2012–2017
Goa MLAs 2022–2027